Icelandic Annals are manuscripts which record chronological lists of events of thirteenth, fourteenth century in and around Iceland, though some, like the Annal of the Oddaverjar and the Lawman's annal (Lögmannsannáll) reach the fifteenth century, and the Annal of Gottskálk even reaches the sixteenth.

See also 
Flateyjarannáll – annals found at the end of Flateyjarbók.

References 

Icelandic manuscripts